The Kommando Spezialkräfte (Special Forces Command, KSK) is the special forces military command of the German Army. The KSK has received decorations and awards from NATO, the United States, and its affiliates. KSK operatives have taken part in joint anti-terror operations, notably in the Balkans and Middle East.

History
From 1973 until the KSK's formation in 1996, the West German (and later German) government assigned all counter-terrorist and special operations activities to the GSG 9, a highly trained police force created shortly after the hostage-taking that transpired during the 1972 Munich Olympic Games. Prior to 1973, the army's Fernspäher (Long-Distance Reconnaissance), the navy's Kampfschwimmer (Combat Swimmers/"Frogmen"), and (until 1989) the Special Weapons Escort Companies—Sonderwaffenbegleitkompanien were the only military units comparable to anything that other nations may have seen as dedicated special forces units.

One political reason for the establishment of the KSK was that in 1994, during the genocide in Rwanda, German citizens had to be evacuated by Belgian para-commandos. This task was carried out by special operations forces of the former colonial power Belgium as agreed upon in advance by the NATO partners. The Federal Government of Germany also refused to intervene on its own, as in its view neither the GSG 9 nor the Bundeswehr "Bravo Companies" were trained to operate in guerrilla situations and there was also a lack of the required transport capability. Several Belgian soldiers died during this operation. Due to the political pressure, the need to have its own forces ready for special operations within NATO became evident.

Following the KSK's activation on 1 April 1997, all but one of the Fernspähkompanie have been either disbanded or merged into the newly constituted unit.

Like all German military units, KSK deployments require authorization from the German Bundestag (Federal Assembly). The unit has engaged in numerous anti-terror campaigns both in Europe and abroad; known engagements include operations inside Kosovo, Bosnia and Herzegovina, and most recently in Afghanistan.

During the War in Afghanistan, although nominally under OEF command, the KSK worked under ISAF command since 2005, carrying out numerous operations in the vicinity of the German deployment in Kabul, including a successful raid on an al-Qaeda safehouse for suicide bombers in October 2006. KSK operators have commented in the German media about the restrictions placed on them by their national caveats and stated a preference for working directly for the Americans as part of OEF-A as they had done as part of Task Force K-Bar.

As is to be expected with such units, specific operational details such as success and casualty rates are considered to be top secret and withheld even from the highest-ranking members of the Bundestag. This practice has elicited some serious concerns, resulting in agreement to increase both transparency and accountability, by disclosing mission details to selected members of the Bundestag, in relation to the future deployments of KSK forces.

On 4 May 2013, the KSK reported its first casualty. First Sergeant Daniel Wirth was fatally shot in Baghlan Province, Afghanistan during operation "Maiwand". US Army forces were part of the attempted rescue mission. Daniel Wirth was honoured by his sister Kathrin Wirth-Torrente in a book titled "Brothers in Bravery". It not only tells her brother's story, but also reflects on 40 additional military members who lost their lives while fighting The Global War on Terror in the Greater Middle East. The book was published by the Travis Manion Foundation in September 2017.

In 2018, the German Federal Criminal Police Office uncovered a plot involving unknown KSK soldiers to murder prominent German politicians such as Claudia Roth, Heiko Maas and Joachim Gauck among others, and carry out attacks against immigrants living in Germany. Also, earlier that same year in a separate investigation, the State prosecutors in the city of Tübingen investigated whether neo-Nazi symbols were used at a "farewell" event involving members of KSK.

In June 2020, German defence minister Annegret Kramp-Karrenbauer announced that the unit would be partially disbanded due to growing far-right extremism within the ranks. The KSK had become partially independent from the chain of command, with a toxic leadership culture. One of the force's four companies where extremism is said to be the most rife was to be dissolved and not replaced.

Commanders
 1996–1998: Brigadier General Fred Schulz
 1998–2000: Brigadier General Hans-Heinrich Dieter
 2000–2003: Brigadier General Reinhard Günzel
 2003–2005: Brigadier General Carl-Hubertus von Butler
 2005–2007: Brigadier General Rainer Hartbrod
 2007–2010: Brigadier General Hans-Christoph Ammon
 2010–2013: Brigadier General Heinz Josef Feldmann
 2013–2017: Brigadier General Dag Knut Baehr
 2018–2021: Brigadier General Markus Kreitmayr
 2021–present: Brigadier General Ansgar Meyer

† Brigadier general Dag Baehr has previously served twice as a field officer in the KSK: First, under the command of Brigadier General Schulz, when it was founded from 1996 until 1999 and then again between 2004 until 2007 under the command of Brigadier General Hartbrod.

Structure

The KSK is a brigade level unit of the regular army divided into two battalion-sized departments Operational Forces and Support Forces and  the HQ and the Development Group.

Organization
 Kommando Spezialkräfte
 KSK Staff
 Psychological Service
 Language Service
 Staff and Command Support Company
 1st Commando Company
 3rd Commando Company
 4th Commando Company
 Special Commando Company
 Special Reconnaissance Company
 Signal Company
 Support Company
 Quartermaster/ Handling Platoon
 Maintenance Platoon
 Parachutes/ Air Handling Platoon
 Medical Center
 Training Department
 Development Department

In 2020 the 2nd Commando Company was dissolved "after an accumulation of incidents and a notable build-up of right-wing extremists in the unit".

Operational forces
Combat-ready units are divided into three commando companies of approximately one hundred men. Each of the three commando companies has five specialized platoons, each with a unique specialty and ability that can be adapted to both the terrain and situation, depending on type action(s) required:

Command Platoons
1st Platoon: vehicle insertion
2nd Platoon: airborne insertion
3rd Platoon: amphibious operations
4th Platoon: operations in special geographic or meteorological surroundings (desert, jungle, mountain or arctic regions)
5th Platoon: reconnaissance, intelligence operations and sniper/counter-sniper operations

There are four commando squads in every platoon. Each of these squads consists of four equally skilled members that have been hand-picked from the German Army into the platoon that best suits their abilities. Each squad member is specially trained as a weapons expert, medic, combat engineer, or communications expert, respectively. Additionally, some groups may contain other specialists, such as a heavy weapons or language expert.

Special Commando Company
The special commando company was established in 2004. This company is staffed with specially trained KSK personnel in the fields of Joint terminal attack controller, IED disposal or handling of military working dogs which may support operations of the commando companies as required. KSK personnel serving in the special commando company are commonly seasoned hands having previously served in one of the three commando companies.

Special Reconnaissance Company
The Special Reconnaissance Company is staffed with KSK members and further personnel specialised in reconnaissance. This company may support operations of the three commando companies with reconnaissance and surveillance abilities, for instance with the use of UAVs.
Female members may also operate as Female Engagement Teams if the task is required.

Support forces
The HQ & Support Company is responsible for supply duties in Germany. For that, the unit is made up of:
 HQ Platoon
 Material Platoon
 Supply Echelon
 Catering Section
 Transport Platoon
 Ammunition and Refueling Platoon

The Signal Company consists of three signal platoons.

While the HQ & Support Company supports the KSK in Germany the Support Company takes supply duties during operations. Therefore, the company is organized in:
 Repair Platoon
 Supply Platoon
 Parachute Equipment Platoon

Insignia

Beret and badge
Members of the KSK wear maroon berets as a symbol of their roots in airborne units. A metal badge is worn which consists of a sword surrounded by oak leaves. The flag of the Federal Republic of Germany is depicted on the bottom of the sword.

Kommandoabzeichen
The Kommandoabzeichen (commando badge) is a cloth patch worn on the right pouch of the uniform. The commando badge's design is similar to the metal badge worn on the beret. It depicts a silver sword on light green background surrounded by oak leaves. The badge was permitted to be worn in 2000 by Federal President Johannes Rau.

Waffenfarbe
KSK units wear green as their Waffenfarbe, similar to infantry units. Before becoming an independent military force, the KSK was a part of infantry units.

Selection and training

Initially, only officers and non-commissioned officers of the Bundeswehr could apply for service with the KSK and the subsequent evaluation period. As a prerequisite for entry, the Bundeswehr Commando Course (Einzelkämpferlehrgang) must have been completed by the applicant. Since 2005, however, applications have also been opened to civilians and enlisted personnel who must complete an 18-month Long Range Surveillance training cycle before the intense KSK selection process begins.

The selection process for the  combat positions is divided into two phases: a three-week-long physical and psychological training regimen (normally having a 40% pass rate), and later a three-month-long physical endurance phase (normally with an 8–10% pass rate). During latter phase, the KSK use the Black Forest as their proving grounds for prospective operators. In this time, candidates must undergo a grueling 90-hour cross-country run, followed by a three-week international Combat Survival Course at the German-led multinational Special Operations Training Center (formerly the International Long Range Reconnaissance School) in Pfullendorf.

Upon successful completion of the selection process, candidates may be allowed to start their 2–3-year training cycle with the KSK. This training includes roughly twenty courses at over seventeen schools worldwide: in Norway for Arctic terrain, Austria for mountainous terrain; El Paso, Texas, or Israel for desert and/or bush training; San Diego for amphibious operations; and Belize for jungle experience.

According to press releases from May 2008, the Bundeswehr aims to advance the attractiveness of service in the KSK to women. This is partially because the KSK was previously unable to reach its targeted number of troops. The KSK was no longer restricted to male troops after the Bundeswehr opened all units to women in 2001. As of 2021, women occupied auxiliary positions in KSK.

The KSK is known to regularly participate in joint training exercises and personal exchange programs with SOFs from Allied nations which includes:
Australian - 2nd Commando Regiment
British - Special Air Service
Canadian - Joint Task Force 2
Irish - Army Ranger Wing
Polish - JW GROM
United States - Delta Force & Green Berets

See also
 Special Operations Command (SOCOM) – U.S. equivalent command

References

External links

Special forces of Germany
Airborne units and formations of Germany
Units and formations of the German Army (1956–present)
Military units and formations established in 1996
Military counterterrorist organizations
German involvement in the Syrian civil war